The men's track time trial, a part of the cycling events at the 1928 Summer Olympics, took place at the Olympic Stadium in Amsterdam. Sixteen cyclists from 16 nations competed. Each nation was limited to one competitor. The distance was 1 kilometre. The race was won by the Danish rider Willy Hansen in 1 minutes, 14.4 seconds. Gerard Bosch van Drakestein of the Netherlands took silver, while Dunc Gray of Australia earned bronze. It was the first medal for each of the three nations in the men's track time trial; none had competed in 1896.

Background

This was the second appearance of the event, which had previously been held in 1896. It would be held every Games until being dropped from the programme after 2004. The event was a "new event" in track cycling, "supposedly popular in Italy."

Twelve of the 16 competing nations made their debut in the event: Argentina, Australia, Belgium, Canada, Chile, Denmark, Ireland, Italy, the Netherlands, Poland, Switzerland, and Turkey. The four returning nations were Austria, France, Germany, and Great Britain.

Competition format

The event was a time trial on the track, with each cyclist competing separately to attempt to achieve the fastest time. Unlike in 1896, the competition used a standing start. The distance was also increased to one kilometre rather than the one-third of a kilometre used previously.

Records

There were no standing world or Olympic records prior to the 1928 Summer Olympics; world records were not ratified by the UCI until 1949 and the event (at the 1 kilometre distance) had not previously been held at the Olympics.

* World records were not tracked by the UCI until 1949.

Octave Dayen went first, earning a de facto Olympic record at 1:16.0. Gerard Bosch van Drakestein was the first man to beat Dayen, recording a time of 1:15.2. This held until Willy Hansen, racing 14th of 16, achieved a 1:14.4 time.

Schedule

Results

The Official Report omits Rodríguez and Cattaneo, but other sources demonstrate that the two men did compete.

Notes
De Wael lists 16 competitors, with Francisco Rodríguez of Argentina placing 8th and Angelo Cattaneo of Italy tying with Aerts for 9th (with other finishers moving down correspondingly). Their names were not on the 1928 Official Report, but were discovered via research on Dutch newspapers from the time.

References

Track cycling at the 1928 Summer Olympics
Cycling at the Summer Olympics – Men's track time trial